De Aar railway station is a railway station serving the town of De Aar, in the Northern Cape province of South Africa. De Aar is a major junction where the Cape Town–Kimberley main line meets a line from Port Elizabeth and another from Upington and Namibia. As such, it is served by several routes of the Shosholoza Meyl inter-city service.

Transport in the Northern Cape
Shosholoza Meyl stations